Seaford is a station on the Babylon Branch of the Long Island Rail Road. It is officially located at New York State Route 27 and Jackson Avenue in Seaford, New York, however parking areas stretch as beyond Washington Avenue east of this corner, and west towards the interchange with New York State Route 135.

History
Seaford station is typical of the elevated Babylon Branch stations that were rebuilt during the mid-to-late 20th century. What makes it atypical, however, is its close proximity to the Seaford-Oyster Bay Expressway interchange. The station was opened on May 26, 1899. It was razed on April 15, 1966 as part of the grade elimination project, which was built between 1966 and 1967.

Seaford is a terminus for some eastbound PM-rush hour trains.

Beginning in 2008 the station underwent another renovation, with complete rebuilding of the station's platforms and shelters, plus the installation of an elevator. Though the reconstruction was scheduled to be completed on January 1, 2010, it was actually finished by July 31, 2009, several months ahead of schedule.

Station layout
The station has one 12-car-long high-level island platform between the two tracks.

References

External links 

Old Seaford Station (Arrt's Arrchives)
 Jackson Avenue entrance from Google Maps Street View

Long Island Rail Road stations in Nassau County, New York
Railway stations in the United States opened in 1899